Mojeek is a search engine based in the United Kingdom. The search results provided by Mojeek come from its own index of web pages, created by crawling the web.

History
In 2004, the Mojeek search engine started out as a personal project by Marc Smith at the Sussex Innovation Centre. The search technology was created from the ground up using mostly the C programming language and for much of its early life, the servers were run from Marc's bedroom.

In 2006, Mojeek became the first search engine to have a no tracking privacy policy. This policy remains in place to this day.

After receiving investment, Mojeek was officially incorporated as a limited company in 2009.

On 26 January 2011, it was highlighted as an alternative British-based search engine during a Parliamentary debate on UK internet search engines over "allegations of manipulation of Google's search results, particularly the unfavourable treatment of its unpaid and sponsored results, and the preferential placement of [their] own services."

As of 2013, Mojeek's servers are run from the Custodian data centres in Maidstone, which bills itself as "one of the greenest data centres in the UK."

On 15 April 2015, the BBC's World Global Show and Radio 5 Live talked to Marc about the Mojeek search engine and the EU's decision to file a complaint against Google over alleged anti-competitive behaviour.

In 2017, in partnership with EMRAYS Technologies, Mojeek launched a demo of their emotional search engine which allows users to search for pages with certain emotional content.

As of May 2019, Mojeek's index contained over 2.3 billion pages, and by April 2020, that number had increased to over 3 billion. As of June 2021 Mojeek has 4 billion pages  and in March 2022, 5 billion pages. It hit the 6 billion mark in October 2022.

In 2022, Mojeek became the default search engine of Privacy Browser. It was subsequently added to Pale Moon and the SerenityOS Web browser.

Key features
Mojeek is a crawler-based search engine that provides independent search results using its own index of web pages, rather than using results from other search engines.

References

External links
 

British websites
Internet search engines